Ciara Baxendale (born 19 July 1995) is an English actress.

Early life
Baxendale was born on 19 July 1995 in Helmshore, Lancashire. She graduated from a one-year foundation course at the Royal Academy of Dramatic Art and is a member of the National Youth Film Academy.

Career
Baxendale is perhaps best known for her role as Izzy on the E4 teen comedy-drama series My Mad Fat Diary (2013–2015). She has also starred in films such as Spike Island (2012) and series such as Little Crackers (2011), The Driver (2014), and DCI Banks (2015).

Filmography

Film

Television

References

External links
 

Living people
English television actresses
1995 births
People from the Borough of Rossendale
Alumni of RADA
Actresses from Lancashire
21st-century English actresses